was a Japanese entrepreneur from Toyama, Etchu Province (present-day Toyama Prefecture) who founded the Yasuda zaibatsu (安田財閥). He was a maternal great-grandfather of Yoko Ono via his adoptive son, Yasuda Zenzaburō (安田善三郎).

Early life

Yasuda Zenjirō was the son of a poor samurai  and a member of the Yasuda clan in Etchu Province.

Zenjirō moved to Edo at the age of 17 and began working in a money changing house.

Career
In 1863, he started providing tax-farming services to the Tokugawa Shogunate. After the Meiji Restoration, he provided the same services to the new Meiji government. Yasuda profited from the delay between the collection of taxes and their forwarding to the government. He greatly magnified his wealth by buying up depreciated Meiji paper money that the government subsequently exchanged for gold.

Yasuda helped establish the Third National Bank in 1876.  Later, in 1880, Yasuda set up the Yasuda Bank (later the Fuji Bank, now Mizuho Financial Group) and the Yasuda Mutual Life Insurance Company (later merged to form Meiji Yasuda Life Insurance), which he organized into a zaibatsu holding company.  In 1893, the Yasuda zaibatsu absorbed the Tokyo Fire Insurance Company (renamed the Yasuda Fire and Marine Insurance Company, now Sompo Japan Insurance).

Yasuda was among the best financiers that Japan had; however he was not adventurous and hardly expanded the business beyond finance. Most of the industrial houses associated with Yasuda were actually those that Asano Soichiro (the founder of the Asano zaibatsu) started, whom Yasuda trusted and provided loans to. More accurately, therefore, they belonged to Asano zaibatsu and were merely affiliated to Yasuda Zaibatsu.

Philanthropy
In his later years, he donated the Yasuda Auditorium to the Tokyo Imperial University and the Hibiya Kokaido hall.
He owned a lot of land in Tokyo. It is now used as Yasuda Garden, Yasuda Gakuen, and Doai Memorial Hospital. People love these places.

Murder
Yasuda was assassinated in 1921 by nationalist lawyer  Asahi Heigo because Yasuda had refused to make a financial donation to a worker's hotel.

Legacy
Yasuda’s adopted son, Yasuda Zenzaburō (安田善三郎) is the maternal grandfather of  artist and singer Yoko Ono, the widow of musician John Lennon. Lennon, on seeing Yasuda's photograph for the first time, is alleged to have said "That's me in a former life", to which Ono replied "Don't say that. He was assassinated." Lennon  was assassinated in 1980.

References 

1838 births
1921 deaths
Japanese murder victims
People murdered in Japan
People from Toyama (city)
People of Meiji-period Japan
19th-century Japanese businesspeople
20th-century Japanese businesspeople